An armed schooner was a small warship of the age of sail, most often of schooner rig but the term is also used for other rigs, for example  was cutter rigged.

See also

 :Category:Schooners of the Royal Navy
 :Category:Schooners of the United States Navy
 List of schooners
 

+Armed schooner
Naval ships